The Asian Food Network (AFN), formerly known as Asian Food Channel, is a Southeast Asian pay television channel and website owned by Warner Bros. Discovery International. Launched in 2005, it provides a mix of food programming content primarily focused on Asian cuisine.

History
The Asian Food Network was co-founded by Hian Goh and Maria Brown in 2005. The idea was conceived by Goh, an investment banker, and Brown, a journalist at the BBC, in 2004 to bring a food television channel to Asia. Launched under the name Asian Food Channel, it was Asia's first pay-TV food channel.

Content for the network was originally purchased from overseas markets and included shows such as Meat and Greet and Singapore Flavours from Mediacorp. In 2009, it launched AFC Studio at Orchard Central in Singapore. It allowed fans to purchase branded merchandise and also used for original content creation such as Great Dinners Of The World and Big Break. By 2013, the network reached 130 million viewers in 12 markets.

Scripps Networks Interactive purchased the channel in 2013. It became part of Discovery, Inc. in 2018 when Discovery acquired Scripps Networks Interactive, The channel was rebranded as Asian Food Network in 2019, with a larger focus placed on multi-platform content.

Programming
The Asian Food Network provides a wide mix of food programming content that are sourced internationally such as the United Kingdom, the US, Canada, Europe, Australia, as well as Asian specific content from Korea, Japan, China, Philippines, Taiwan, Malaysia, Indonesia, Singapore and Thailand.

Most shows are subtitled, but English shows are sometimes subtitled in Chinese, like in SkyCable. Others don't have subtitles in English programming such as on Cignal.

Featured Chefs/Hosts

References

External links
 
 About Asian Food Network
 Channel Availability
 Ngiam Ying Lan. "Asian Food Channel: For the first time – a new taste for cable TV", The Business Times, 12 August 2005. Retrieved on 3 November 2007.
 Founder of AFC on ten lessons for a successful career

Food and drink television
Food Network
Warner Bros. Discovery Asia-Pacific
Warner Bros. Discovery networks
Television stations in Singapore
Television channels and stations established in 2005
Former E. W. Scripps Company subsidiaries